County Durham and Darlington Fire and Rescue Service is the statutory fire and rescue service covering an area of , for the  unitary authority areas of County Durham and Darlington. The service area borders with Cleveland Fire Brigade, North Yorkshire Fire and Rescue Service, Northumberland Fire and Rescue Service, Tyne and Wear Fire and Rescue Service and Cumbria Fire and Rescue Service.

History
The service was formed on 1 April 1948 as a result of the Fire Services Act 1947. The first chief fire officer was  C.V Hall and was appointed this position on 19 September 1947. The large area covered by the FRS was then divided into three areas, consisting of: Divisions A-C.

Performance
In 2018/2019, every fire and rescue service in England and Wales was subjected to a statutory inspection by Her Majesty's Inspectorate of Constabulary and Fire & Rescue Services (HIMCFRS). The inspection investigated how well the service performs in each of three areas. On a scale of outstanding, good, requires improvement and inadequate, Durham and Darlington Fire and Rescue Service was rated as follows:

Headquarters
The service now has its own training school and workshops located in Bowburn and headquarters located in Belmont.

Fire stations 
The service divides its 15 fire stations and 1 Technical Services Centre into two divisions: North and South.
Fire stations are crewed by wholetime firefighters, daytime firefighters, on-call (retained) firefighters, or a combination of the different crewing systems.

See also
 Fire service in the United Kingdom
 Fire apparatus
 Fire Engine
 FiReControl
 List of British firefighters killed in the line of duty

References

External links

 
County Durham and Darlington Fire and Rescue Service at HMICFRS

Fire and rescue services of England
Organisations based in County Durham